NOTS may refer to

Naval Ordnance Test Station of Naval Air Weapons Station China Lake, US
Naval Overseas Transportation Service of pre-1949 US Military Sealift Command
Negros Oriental Trade School of Negros Oriental State University, Philippines
New Era Dianetics for OTs, an Operating Thetan level in Scientology
Nots (band), an American noise punk band

See also
 Knot (disambiguation)